Meloe americanus, the buttercup oil beetle, is a species of blister beetle in the family Meloidae. It is found in North America.

Subspecies
These two subspecies belong to the species Meloe americanus:
 Meloe americanus americanus
 Meloe americanus occidentalis Van

References

Further reading

 
 

Meloidae
Articles created by Qbugbot
Beetles described in 1815